Andryushkino is a rural locality (a selo), the only inhabited settlement and the administrative center of Rural National Yukagir Settlement of "Olerinsky Suktul" of Nizhnekolymsky District in the Sakha Republic, Russia, located  from Chersky, the administrative center of the district. Its population as of the 2010 Census was 741, of whom 369 were male and 372 female, down from 845 recorded during the 2002 Census.

Geography

Andryushkino is considered an inaccessible place, for it has no regular communication with the outside world. In winter it can be reached by winter road, but in summer only via the river or by helicopter.

References

Notes

Sources
Official website of the Sakha Republic. Registry of the Administrative-Territorial Divisions of the Sakha Republic. Nizhnekolymsky District. 

Rural localities in Nizhnekolymsky District
Road-inaccessible communities of the Sakha Republic
Alazeya basin